"Wraith" is a song from indie rock quartet Peace. The track was released in the United Kingdom on 13 January 2013 as the lead single from the band's debut studio album, In Love. "Wraith" was written by the band's front-man Harrison Koisser and was produced by Jim Abbiss (Arctic Monkeys, Adele).

Track listing
Vinyl
Wraith – 3:11
Scumbag – 3:29

Digital download
Wraith – 3:11

Critical reception
Sian Rowe of NME reviewed the track positively, writing

Charts

For the chart week dated 26 January 2013, "Wraith" debuted at number seventy-five on the UK Singles Chart—marking the band's first chart appearance.

Credits and personnel
Harrison Koisser – writer
Jim Abiss – producer

Release history

References

2013 singles
Peace (band) songs
2013 songs
Song recordings produced by Jim Abbiss
Columbia Records singles